Conor James Walker McInerney (born 30 March 1994) is an Australian cricketer. He made his first-class debut for South Australia in the 2017–18 Sheffield Shield season on 5 March 2018. He made his List A debut for South Australia in the 2018–19 JLT One-Day Cup on 3 October 2018. In April 2021, McInerney was one of five players to be dropped by the South Australia cricket team, following a season without any wins.

References

External links
 

1994 births
Living people
Australian cricketers
Place of birth missing (living people)
South Australia cricketers